The National Folk Festival (NFF) is a longstanding, Australian family friendly celebration of all aspects of folk music and culture.  It is held every year at Easter in the national capital, Canberra.

Winner of many awards, such as National Qantas Australian Tourism Award for Best Festival in 2009, it features 15-20 venues with vibrant world-class artists, 'blackboard' opportunities, workshops, craft, themed bars and cafes and delectable food. First held in Melbourne in 1967, from 1969 the NFF was held in various states in city and regional venues. Since 1992 the festival had been staged at Exhibition Park in Canberra (EPIC) at Easter from Easter Thursday – Easter Monday. It was cancelled in 2020 due to the COVID-19 pandemic in Australia, and in 2021 was held as a 2-day event dubbed Good Folk at venues spread across Queanbeyan in New South Wales.  It returned to its normal location and timing in 2022.

History
The festival was first held at the Teachers College, Melbourne University on the weekend of 11 –12 February 1967. It was then known as "Port Phillip District Folk Music Festival". Initiated by The Victorian Folk Music Club, The Monash Traditional Music Society, the Burwood Teachers Folk Club and performers Martyn Wyndham-Read and Glenys 'Glen' Tomasetti, it was inspired by the Newport Folk Festival in the United States. From 1969 until 1991 the festival traveled interstate each year. It was hosted at least once in Melbourne, Sydney, Adelaide, Canberra, Brisbane, Fremantle, Alice Springs, Perth, Kuranda and Maleny. From 1988 to 1992 organising groups had heavy financial losses, and the increasing size of the festival made it harder for the hosting states to organise the festival every year, so from 1992 to the present, the festival has been held in Canberra at Exhibition Park in Canberra (EPIC), often with a 'feature state' on the program – providing increased performance opportunities for artists from that state.

COVID-19 impact 
The 2020 festival was not held due to restrictions caused by the COVID-19 pandemic in Australia. In 2021 a scaled-down 2 day version titled "Good Folk", was held over the border in Queanbeyan, NSW across Saturday 3 April and Sunday 4 April. The event was profitable and praised by artists and patrons.

The Festival survived COVID and returned to its normal time and location in April 2022 and arrangements for its 2023 Festival are now underway.

Features

The Festival usually takes place at Exhibition Park in Canberra, which for the duration resembles a small, vibrant and colourful village full of music and dance venues, cafes, themed bars and stalls, as well as a unique 'Community Arts' area for demonstrating and workshopping a range of arts disciplines, as well as the 'Tradition Bearers' demonstration area where visitors can view the making of a range of Australian craft and purchase unique gifts. There is a traditional Bush Camp that resembles an archetypal bush scenario with authentic performances and delectable bush-style damper and stew and Billy Tea. Camping is provided adjacent to the Festival grounds for up to 5,000 people. In 2011 the event was attended by approx 50,000 people. Approximately 800-1100 volunteers make the festival possible.

The festival has over 140 concerts, numerous impromptu street performances, workshops on making, playing and repairing musical instruments, visual art, storytelling and poetry, and many dance workshops. There are at least 60 craft stalls, 30+ food vendors and 5 delightfully themed bars with dedicated restaurant areas. 

For the 5 days of the festival, there is also an almost continuous Session in the world-famous "Session Bar", known as the 'London Underground' of folk music, that only stops briefly due to alcohol licence restrictions in the early morning and kicks off again in mid morning for another round the clock session of music and culture.

International and Australian performers are featured, with the organisers firmly committed to representing the full spectrum of folk/ethnic/Indigenous music.

The festival has an exciting Opening and Closing Concert in the 3,000 seat Budawang Pavilion – and every night the festival has a grand dance, starting with a Scottish Ball on the Friday night, an Irish Ceili on the Saturday, and an Australian Colonial Ball on the Sunday night – as well as a colourful range of diverse dance styles including Latin, tango, flamenco and contra dance.

The National Folk Festival, at EPIC, features several large permanent indoor venues where concert-goers can enjoy music and performances in all weather conditions.

Notes

External links
National Folk Festival Website

Events in Canberra
Festivals in Australian Capital Territory
Recurring events established in 1967
Folk festivals in Australia
Music festivals established in 1967